The 1951 Italian Grand Prix was a Formula One motor race held on 16 September 1951 at Monza. It was race 7 of 8 in the 1951 World Championship of Drivers.

Report
Toulo de Graffenried returned to Alfa Romeo's four-car line up, in place of Paul Pietsch, having raced for Enrico Platé in France and Germany. He raced alongside the regular Alfa drivers, Fangio, Farina and Bonetto. The works Ferrari team retained the same four drivers from the race at the Nürburgring — Ascari, Villoresi, González and Taruffi — while Brazilian Chico Landi made his World Championship debut in a privately run Ferrari. The field was completed by works teams from BRM, Simca-Gordini and OSCA, as well as the usual Talbot-Lago entries.

The front row positions on the grid were shared equally between Alfa Romeo and Ferrari, with Fangio, Farina, Ascari and González posting the four fastest qualifying times. The second row consisted of the remaining works Ferraris of Villoresi and Taruffi, alongside Felice Bonetto. Reg Parnell, in a BRM, was also supposed to be on the second row, but was unable to start due to lubrication problems.

Fangio was the initial race leader, having started from pole position, but he soon had to cede the position to Ascari. He retook the lead on lap eight before pitting for a tyre change, which dropped him to fifth. Early retirements for Farina and de Graffenried left José Froilán González in second, behind his teammate Ascari. Fangio attempted to bridge the gap to the Ferraris, but engine problems eliminated his chances. The sole remaining Alfa driver, Nino Farina, who had taken over Bonetto's car on lap 30, inherited third place as a result of Fangio's retirement. He was fast, but fuel leakages meant that he needed to make two further pitstops; he therefore had to settle for third. Alberto Ascari took his second, and Ferrari's third, consecutive Championship race victory, ahead of British Grand Prix winner González. The other works Ferraris of Villoresi and Taruffi completed the points positions in what was another successful race for the Scuderia.

Ascari's victory took him to within two points of Championship leader Fangio, while González was a further four points behind in third.

Entries

 — Gianni Marzotto withdrew from the event prior to practice
 — Ken Richardson qualified the #32 BRM, although he did not start the race. Hans Stuck was also entered in the same car, but he took no part in either qualifying or the race.
 — Toulo de Graffenried qualified and drove the race in the #36 Alfa Romeo. Consalvo Sanesi was also entered in the car, but injury prevented his participation in the Grand Prix.
 — Felice Bonetto qualified and drove 29 laps of the race in the #40 Alfa Romeo. Nino Farina, whose own vehicle had already retired, took over the car for a further 50 laps.
 — Maurice Trintignant qualified the #50 Simca-Gordini but was secretly replaced for the race by Jean Behra.

Classification

Qualifying

Race

Notes
 – Includes 1 point for fastest lap
 – Behra secretly replaced the unwell Trintignant for the race. Team principal Amédée Gordini did not inform the race organizers about the switch as it would have cut the team's starting fee. Behra even wore his compatriot's helmet to disguise the switch.

Shared drive
 Farina (50 laps) took over from Bonetto (29) after Farina's car retired. Points for 3rd position were shared between the drivers (Farina received 1 extra point for setting the fastest race lap).

Championship standings after the race 
Drivers' Championship standings

 Note: Only the top five positions are listed. Only the best 4 results counted towards the Championship. Numbers without parentheses are Championship points; numbers in parentheses are total points scored.

References

Italian
Italian Grand Prix
1951 in Italian motorsport
Italian